The prime minister of Jamaica is Jamaica's head of government, currently Andrew Holness. Holness, as leader of the governing Jamaica Labour Party (JLP), was sworn in as prime minister on 7 September 2020, having been re-elected as a result of the JLP's landslide victory in the 2020 Jamaican general election.

The prime minister is formally appointed into office by the governor general, who represents King Charles III.

Official residence and office

The prime minister of Jamaica's official residence is Vale Royal. The property was constructed in 1694 by the planter Sir William Taylor, who was one of the richest men in Jamaica at the time. In 1928 the property was sold to the government and became the official residence of the British colonial secretary (then Sir Reginald Edward Stubbs). Vale Royal has subsequently become the official residence of the prime minister. Vale Royal is not open to the public.

 has been the location of the Office of the Prime Minister since 1972. Prime Ministers resided there from 1964 until 1980. On 8 November 2022, Prime Minister Andrew Holness said in question time that his official residence was Jamaica House rather than Vale Royal, and that that Vale Royal was currently in disrepair and possible future uses would be considered after its restoration.

Chief ministers of Jamaica (1953–1959)

Premiers of Jamaica (1959–1962)

Prime ministers of Jamaica (1962–present)
Key:
 Died in office

By tenure

See also
 Prime Ministers of Queen Elizabeth II
 List of Commonwealth Heads of Government
 Politics of Jamaica
 Prime Minister of the West Indies Federation
 Governor-General of Jamaica
 List of heads of state of Jamaica
 List of Privy Counsellors (1952–2022)

References

External links
 Government of Jamaica - Office of the Prime Minister - Official website

 
Jamaica, Prime Minister of
Prime Ministers
1962 establishments in Jamaica